Richard Andrew (died 1477) was a Canon of Windsor from 1450 to 1455, Archdeacon of Sarum from 1441 to 1444 and Dean of York from 1452 - 1477.

Career

He was appointed:
First Warden of All Souls College, Oxford 1437 - 1442
Archdeacon of Sarum 1441 - 1444
Prebendary of Farringdon in Salisbury 1447
Prebendary of Stratton in Salisbury 1449
Prebendary of North Grantham in Salisbury 1454
Prebendary of Warthill in York 1445
Prebendary of Newbald in York 1449
Dean of York 1452 - 1477
Prebendary of Oxton in Southwell 1461 - 1476
King's Secretary
Rector of Hayes, Kent

He was appointed to the ninth stall in St George's Chapel, Windsor Castle in 1450 and held the canonry until 1455.

Notes 

1477 deaths
Canons of Windsor
Deans of York
Archdeacons of Sarum
Year of birth unknown